Chariesthes subtricolor is a species of beetle in the family Cerambycidae. It was described by Stephan von Breuning in 1967. It is known from Gabon and Cameroon.

References

Chariesthes
Beetles described in 1967